The European Fencing Confederation (EFC; , CEE) is an international body created in 1991, charged with the promotion and development of fencing in Europe. It organises the European Fencing Championships annually at several levels: cadets (U17), junior (U20), under 23, seniors and veterans (more than 40 years old).

The Confederation comprises all national European fencing federations, plus that of Israel, and is under the authority of FIE. In reaction to the 2022 Russian invasion of Ukraine, the EFC agreed with the FIE to ban Russian and Belarusian fencers, and reallocated competitions that were due to be held in Russia and Belarus. On 10 March 2023, the European Fencing Confederation became the first regional Olympic governing body to officially reinstate Russian and Belarusian athletes and officials, in time for the start of the qualification for the 2024 Summer Olympics.

History and goals
It was founded on 26 October 1991 in Vienna, Austria, and is based in Luxembourg at the headquarters of the Luxembourg Fencing Federation.

Its goals are:
promotion and development of fencing in Europe;
facilitate technical collaboration between the different federations;
co-ordination and improvement of the teaching of fencing in Europe;
representation of fencing to European authorities;
organisation of the European Fencing Championships.

Russian oligarch Alisher Usmanov was president of the European Fencing Confederation from 2005 to 2009.

In reaction to the 2022 Russian invasion of Ukraine, the EFC agreed with the FIE to ban Russian and Belarusian fencers, and reallocated competitions that were due to be held in Russia and Belarus. On 10 March 2023, the European Fencing Confederation became the first regional Olympic governing body to officially reinstate Russian and Belarusian athletes and officials, in time for the start of the qualification for the 2024 Summer Olympics.

In June 2022, Stanislav Pozdnyakov, the Russian Olympic Committee (ROC) President, was removed from his position as European Fencing Confederation President at an Extraordinary Congress following a unanimous vote of no confidence in Pozdnyakov in March 2022, due to his xenophobic conduct in the wake of the Russian invasion of Ukraine.

Organs

The organs of the EFC comprise:
the General Assembly—the supreme organ of the Confederation, composed of delegates appointed by the member federations;
the Executive Committee (COMEX)—composed of 10 members elected by the General Assembly, each from a different federation;
the President;
two Auditors.

Commissions
The COMEX elects the members of nine commissions that deal with specialised areas:
Competition Commission;
Veterans Commission;
Promotion/Marketing Commission;
Referees Commission;
Training/Fencing Masters Commission;
SEMI Commission;
Athletes Commission;
Finance Commission;
Handicapped Commission.

See also
Fédération Internationale d'Escrime
European Fencing Championships

References

External links
 European Fencing Confederation (EFC), official site

  
Fencing organizations
Fen
1991 establishments in Europe
Sports organizations established in 1991